This is a list of paintings by the British Pre-Raphaelite artist Dante Gabriel Rossetti. Most painting details are referenced from the Rossetti Archive,
 with some additional paintings researched from The Walker Art Gallery.

1840s

1850s

1860s

1870s

1880s

Notes

Rosetti